Hans Sigvart Johansen (25 December 1881 – 22 September 1964) was a Norwegian rifle shooter competing in the early 20th century. He won a bronze medal at the 1920 Summer Olympics in Antwerp in the team small-bore rifle competition.

References

External links
profile

1881 births
1964 deaths
Norwegian male sport shooters
ISSF rifle shooters
Olympic bronze medalists for Norway
Olympic shooters of Norway
Shooters at the 1920 Summer Olympics
Olympic medalists in shooting
Medalists at the 1920 Summer Olympics
20th-century Norwegian people